The Red String is a 2004 documentary film about four adopted Chinese girls and their single mother parents. It was directed by Elizabeth Pearson.

References

External links
Asian American Media - The Red String - home distribution page for the documentary

American documentary films
2004 films
Documentary films about adoption
2004 documentary films
2000s English-language films
2000s American films